The 2016–17 Saint Kitts Premier Division, alternatively known as the SNKFA Super League, is the 37th season of the Saint Kitts Premier Division, the top division of football in Saint Kitts. The league consists of 10 clubs that play 24 matches with a three-match series against each other club. The regular season began on 10 September 2016 and ended on 14 May 2017. The season culminates with the playoffs to determine the league champion that run from 24 May 2017 until 17 June 2017.

Cayon Rockets are the defending champions.

Table

Regular season

Final four 
The top four finishers of the regular season will participate in the single round-robin "Final Four", to determine the league champion.

Table

Matches

Round 1

Round 2

Round 3

Championship final 
The top two finishers of the final four will participate in a best two-of-three series to determine the champion. The third leg is only played if necessary.

     

Cayon Rockets won the series 2–0

See also 
2016–17 N1 League

References 

1
Saint Kitts and Nevis
SKNFA Super League seasons